Possible Dust Clouds is the tenth studio album by American musician Kristin Hersh. It was released on October 5, 2018 under Fire Records.

Release
On July 24, 2018, Hersh announced the release of her tenth studio album, along with the first single "No Shade in Shadow".

Critical reception
Possible Dust Clouds was met with "generally favorable" reviews from critics. At Metacritic, which assigns a weighted average rating out of 100 to reviews from mainstream publications, this release received an average score of 78, based on 9 reviews. Aggregator Album of the Year gave the release a 82 out of 100 based on a critical consensus of 5 reviews.

Accolades

Track listing

Personnel

Musicians
 Kristin Hersh – primary artist, bass, producer
 David Narcizo – drums
 Fred Abong – bass
 Rob Ahlers – drums, engineer
 Christopher E. Brady – bass, backing vocals
 Wyatt True – drums

Production
 Steve Rizzo – mastering, mixer, producer

References

2018 albums
Kristin Hersh albums